Saminu Kwari Abdullahi (born 3 January 2001) is a Nigerian football player who plays for Russian club FC Veles Moscow.

Club career
He made his debut in the Russian Football National League for FC Veles Moscow on 31 July 2021 in a game against FC Tom Tomsk.

References

External links
 
 Profile by Russian Football National League

2001 births
Sportspeople from Jos
Living people
Nigerian footballers
Association football midfielders
FK Spartaks Jūrmala players
FC Veles Moscow players
Latvian Higher League players
Russian First League players
Nigerian expatriate footballers
Expatriate footballers in Latvia
Nigerian expatriate sportspeople in Latvia
Expatriate footballers in Russia
Nigerian expatriate sportspeople in Russia